Kamraj Kesari (24 October 1922 – 26 March 1985) was an Indian cricketer who played 33 matches of first-class cricket for several teams in India from 1941 to 1959.

A middle-order batsman and right-arm off-spin bowler, he took 7 for 55 and 2 for 41 for Gujarat when they lost by three runs to Western India in the Ranji Trophy in 1945-46. He took 6 for 62 and scored 142, his only first-class century, for Central Provinces and Berar in a drawn match against Holkar in 1948-49.

References

External links

1922 births
1985 deaths
Indian cricketers
Cricketers from Nagpur
Madhya Pradesh cricketers
South Zone cricketers
Vidarbha cricketers
Central Zone cricketers
Gujarat cricketers
Baroda cricketers